The Walter Camp Football Foundation (WCFF) is one of the organizations whose College Football All-America Team is recognized by the National Collegiate Athletic Association. The organization also presents various awards. It is named in honor of football pioneer Walter Camp.

Awards
Walter Camp Player of the Year
CT Player of the Year
Walter Camp Coach of the Year
Walter Camp Man of the Year
Walter Camp Alumni of the Year
Walter Camp Distinguished American Award
Joseph W. Kelly Award (high school)

Footnotes

External links
 

College football mass media
American journalism organizations